Ed Graves (24 February 1917 – 17 February 1980) was an American art director. He was nominated for an Academy Award in the category Best Art Direction for the film Doctor Dolittle.

Selected filmography
 Doctor Dolittle (1967)

References

External links

1917 births
1980 deaths
American art directors